Ed Konopasek is a former offensive tackle in the National Football League.

Biography
Konopasek was born Edward Steven Konpasek on April 12, 1964 in Gary, Indiana.

Career
Konopasek played for the Green Bay Packers during the 1987 NFL season. He played at the collegiate level at Ball State University.

See also
List of Green Bay Packers players
Ball State University Notable Alumni

References

Players of American football from Gary, Indiana
Green Bay Packers players
American football offensive tackles
Ball State University alumni
Ball State Cardinals football players
Living people
1964 births